Tales from the Planet Earth is a 1986 anthology of science fiction stories edited by Frederik Pohl and Elizabeth Anne Hull It presents 19 stories, sharing a common background developed by Pohl and Hull, by 18 authors from 18 different countries; each author's story is set in his native country, plus one extra story by Pohl. According to its cover, it contains stories about aliens which came to "occupy our bodies and inhabit our souls" and they "must find humans capable of hosting personalities and thoughts transmitted across the cosmos".

The collection was dedicated for the memory of A. Bertram Chandler and Janusz A. Zajdel.

Contents
Sitting Around the Pool, Soaking Up the Rays · Frederik Pohl, originally in IASFM Aug ’84 
The Thursday Events · Ye Yonglie 
User Friendly · Spider Robinson  
Life as an Ant · André Carneiro 
Fiddling for Waterbuffaloes · Somtow Sucharitkul, originally in  Analog Apr ’86 
S Is for Snake · Lino Aldani, originally "S come serpente", Urania #1021, Apr 27, ’86. 
The Divided Carla · Josef Nesvadba, originally "Rozštěpená Karla", in Literární Měsíčník Jun ’85 
The View from the Top of the Tower · Harry Harrison, originally in  F&SF May ’86 
Don’t Knock the Rock · A. Bertram Chandler 
The Owl of Bear Island · Jon Bing 
Contacts of a Fourth Kind · Lyuben Dilov 
Infestation · Brian W. Aldiss 
In the Blink of an Eye · Carlos Maria Federici 
Particularly Difficult Territory · Janusz A. Zajdel (Polish title: "Wyjątkowo trudny teren")
Time Everlasting · Sam J. Lundwall 
The Middle Kingdom · Tong Enzheng & Elizabeth Anne Hull, adapt. 
On the Inside Track · Karl-Michael Armer, originally in  Entropie, 1986 
The Legend of the Paper Spaceship · Tetsu Yano; trans. by Gene Van Troyer & Tomoko Oshiro, originally 1978 
We Servants of the Stars · Frederik Pohl

Reception
Orson Scott Card described the anthology as "a world tour of science fiction" and reported "it will make you more appreciative of the best of America sf -- and more impatient with sameness, the repetitiveness, the insularity that so often afflicts us."

References

1986 anthologies
Science fiction anthologies